Sandycroft railway station was located on the eastern edge of the village of Sandycroft, Flintshire.

History
Opened 1 March 1884 by the London and North Western Railway, it was served by what is now the North Wales Coast Line between Chester, Cheshire and Holyhead, Anglesey. The station was located near Deeside, in England. It had two platforms made of wood, upon which were only very basic wooden waiting facilities, and a single storey brick booking office. The two platforms were connected by a footbridge and there was a signalbox positioned between the middle two of the four tracks.

In 1896 the then Archbishop of Canterbury, Edward Benson died at Hawarden Castle and his body was put on the train at Sandycroft to be returned to London. The station closed on 1 May 1961, although a private siding remained in use for some time after, and the 1980s the number of tracks running through the abandoned site were reduced down to two. The signal box was taken out of use and demolished in 2005 and there are no structures or platforms on the site left to be seen.

References

Further reading

Disused railway stations in Flintshire
Former London and North Western Railway stations
Railway stations in Great Britain opened in 1884
Railway stations in Great Britain closed in 1961